Rulon Ellis Gardner (born August 16, 1971) is an American retired Greco-Roman Olympic Gold Medalist wrestler. He competed at the 2000 and 2004 Olympics and won the gold medal in 2000, defeating Russia's three-time reigning gold medalist Aleksandr Karelin in the final. Karelin was previously unbeaten for 13 years in international competition. Gardner won a bronze medal at the 2004 Games.

Personal background 
Gardner was born in Afton, Wyoming. He is the son of Reed and Virginia Gardner and the last of nine children. His second great grandfather was Archibald Gardner, who was one of the early settlers of Star Valley, Wyoming. He attributes his strength to the physical labor that he performed growing up and working on the family's dairy farm.

In 2005, Gardner published his autobiography (co-written by Bob Schaller), Never Stop Pushing: My Life from a Wyoming Farm to the Olympic Medals Stand, in which he describes his Greco-Roman wrestling career, his academic struggles (as someone who suffers from a learning disability) and an account of his near-death experience when stranded after a snowmobile accident.

As of 2011, Gardner worked as a motivational speaker, often appearing as a keynote presenter and event host. He has appeared at corporate events, celebrity golf tournaments, trade shows, and conventions. He also has licensing deals, as well as print and television endorsements.

In 2012, Gardner and his wife Kami filed for Chapter 7 Bankruptcy in a Salt Lake City Federal court, with $2.9 million in liabilities.

After the Athens Olympics, Gardner gained 210 pounds, culminating in a total body weight of 474 pounds. In January 2011, he was announced as a contestant on season 11 of the American reality television show, The Biggest Loser. After 16 weeks on the show, Gardner had lost 173 pounds. Gardner shocked the trainers, staff, and contestants on the April 26 episode by announcing he would be leaving the show "for personal reasons", and left the show without a final weigh-in. He did not appear on the final episode of the season, except in the background of scenes of other contestants.

Injuries 
When Gardner was in elementary school, he was injured during a class show-and-tell, when his abdomen was punctured with an arrow.

In 2002, Gardner went snowmobiling with some friends in the mountains surrounding Star Valley, Wyoming. At one point, he became separated from the group. During his efforts to regain his composure and regroup, he fell into the freezing Salt River with his snowmobile. Unable to move any farther, Gardner decided to build a shelter and wait for a rescue team. He remained stranded for the next 18 hours. After several hours in his makeshift shelter, he stopped shivering, which led him to believe that he was dying. When he was eventually rescued, he was experiencing hypothermia and severe frostbite. Due to the physical damage, a saw had to be used to remove his boots. The harrowing experience cost Gardner the middle toe on his right foot, which he keeps in formaldehyde in a jar in his refrigerator, to remind him of his mortality. He told his story on a first-season episode of I Survived....

On February 24, 2007, Gardner and two other men survived a crash when a light aircraft he was traveling in crashed into Lake Powell, Utah. The men swam an hour in 44 °F (7 °C) water to reach shore, and then spent the night without shelter. None of the three sustained life-threatening injuries.

Educational background 
High school
Gardner attended Star Valley High School in Afton, Wyoming, and was a three-sport letter winner and standout in football, wrestling, and track and field. He was an All-State selection in both football and wrestling, and was also the 1989 Wyoming wrestling state heavyweight champion. In track and field, as a senior, he took second at the state finals in the shot put.

College years
Gardner attended junior college at Ricks College (now BYU-Idaho) in Rexburg, Idaho, and as a sophomore won the NJCAA national heavyweight wrestling championship. He and his first wife Sheri lost their daughter, Stacey in a terrible car accident on December 26, 1990. He then earned a scholarship to attend the University of Nebraska–Lincoln. While at Nebraska, Gardner finished fourth in the 275 lb. weight class at the 1993 NCAA Championships, earning All-American honors. He graduated from the University of Nebraska–Lincoln with a bachelor's degree in physical education. He attended both Ricks and Nebraska on wrestling scholarships.

Wrestling career

Olympics 
Gardner is known for his defeat of three-time reigning gold medalist Aleksandr Karelin at the 2000 Summer Olympics. Karelin had been undefeated for 13 years, and had not given up a point in six years, prior to his loss in the gold medal match to Gardner.

In 2001, Gardner added a world championship to his list of accomplishments with a victory in the finals over Mihaly Deak-Bardos of Hungary. His win made him the only American to ever win both a World and Olympic title in Greco-Roman wrestling.

After the 2000 Olympics he suffered a series of injuries from both a snowmobiling and motorcycle accident. These injuries included an amputated toe and a dislocated wrist, but he still went on to win the U.S. Olympic trials for his weight class and then to compete in the 2004 Summer Olympics. He was unable to repeat his 2000 performance, coming away with the Bronze medal, and after his match, he placed his shoes in the middle of the mat as a symbol of retirement from competitive wrestling.

Gardner competed once in mixed martial arts, and in 2004 he became the host for a professional wrestling league called Real Pro Wrestling.

Gardner served as an analyst for NBC Sports coverage of Wrestling at the 2008 Summer Olympics.

Gardner attempted a comeback for the 2012 Olympics but was unable to make the 264.5 pound max weight limit for the U.S. Olympic Trials and therefore ineligible to compete for a position on the Olympic team.

Mixed martial arts 
On December 31, 2004, Gardner fought Hidehiko Yoshida in a judo vs wrestling mixed martial arts (MMA) bout for the Pride Fighting Championships at an event named PRIDE Shockwave 2004. Yoshida, in addition to being an Olympic gold medalist in judo, was a highly successful MMA fighter. Gardner, trained by Randy Couture at Team Quest, won the bout via unanimous decision.

Mixed martial arts record

|-
! style="border-style:none none solid solid; background:#e3e3e3;" | Date
! style="border-style:none none solid solid; background:#e3e3e3;" | Result
! style="border-style:none none solid solid; background:#e3e3e3;" | Record
! style="border-style:none none solid solid; background:#e3e3e3;" | Opponent
! style="border-style:none none solid solid; background:#e3e3e3;" | Event
! style="border-style:none none solid solid; background:#e3e3e3;" | Method
! style="border-style:none none solid solid; background:#e3e3e3;" | Round, Time
! style="border-style:none none solid solid; background:#e3e3e3;" | Notes
|-
| December 31, 2004
| Win
| 1–0
|  Hidehiko Yoshida
| PRIDE Shockwave 2004
| Decision (Unanimous)
| Round 3, 5:00
|
|-

Honors and awards 
Aside from his Olympic medals, his achievements include:
 U.S. Champion in 1995, 1997, and 2001
 James E. Sullivan Award for amateur athlete of the year, 2001
 Jesse Owens Award, 2001
 United States Olympic Committee Sportsman of the Year, 2001
 ESPY award for U.S. Male Olympic athlete of the year, 2001
 Inducted as a Distinguished Member of the National Wrestling Hall of Fame, 2010

Published works 
 Gardner, Rulon and Bob Schaller (2005). Never Stop Pushing: My Life from a Wyoming Farm to the Olympic Medals Stand, Da Capo Press.

References

External links 

 
 
 Rulon Gardner's page from the National Wrestling Hall of Fame and Museum
 "Nine minutes: How the Sydney Olympics changed wrestler Rulon Gardner's life", Deseret Morning News, February 11, 2007
 Gardner's Biggest Loser profile

1971 births
Living people
Sportspeople from Wyoming
People from Afton, Wyoming
Brigham Young University–Idaho alumni
American male sport wrestlers
Nebraska Cornhuskers wrestlers
Wrestlers at the 2000 Summer Olympics
Wrestlers at the 2004 Summer Olympics
Olympic bronze medalists for the United States in wrestling
Olympic gold medalists for the United States in wrestling
Medalists at the 2000 Summer Olympics
Medalists at the 2004 Summer Olympics
World Wrestling Championships medalists
Pan American Games silver medalists for the United States
American male mixed martial artists
Mixed martial artists from Wyoming
Heavyweight mixed martial artists
Mixed martial artists utilizing Greco-Roman wrestling
James E. Sullivan Award recipients
Pan American Games medalists in wrestling
Wrestlers at the 2003 Pan American Games
Medalists at the 2003 Pan American Games
20th-century American people
21st-century American people